World War 11 or WW11 (eleven) may refer to:
A future eleventh world war
A typo of World War I
A typo of World War II
A typo of World War 1
A typo of W11 (disambiguation)